V. G. Panneerdas was the founder of VGP Group of Companies. His story is one of the rags to riches. He started as a poor  man from a remote village called Azhagappa puram near Valliyur in Tamil Nadu, India in the Tirunelveli District. This is often confused by a lot of people with another village of the same name near Nagercoil in the Kanyakumari District. He moved to Chennai in search of opportunities. In 1955, he opened a shop selling items such as alarm clocks, watches and wall clocks. He was the pioneer in South India to introduce Hire Purchase for everyday goods. He built the VGP company from virtually nothing to its present status as a group of companies including retail, real estate and property development, resorts and amusement parks (including VGP Universal Kingdom), and video and audio studios.

References 

Tamil businesspeople